Jannatabad (also Romanized as Jannatābād; also known as Kasimabad, Qāsemābād, and Qāsimābād) is a village in Eqbal-e Gharbi Rural District, in the Central District of Qazvin County, Qazvin Province, Iran. At the 2006 census, its population was 259, in 72 families.

References 

Populated places in Qazvin County